Jefferson House is the ambassadorial residence in Colombo for the Ambassador of the United States in Sri Lanka. It was built in 1914 in the Cinnamon Gardens a suburb of Colombo. Once the home of Hon. Justice V. M. Fernando, Judge of the Supreme Court of Ceylon, it was purchased by the Government of the United States in 1948, for the use of its Ambassador to Ceylon and it was named after Thomas Jefferson.

See also
Old United States Chancery, Colombo
Westminster House
India House

References
Sri Lanka America Society AGM

Diplomatic missions of the United States
Diplomatic residences in Colombo
Sri Lanka–United States relations
British colonial architecture in Sri Lanka
Manor houses in Sri Lanka